A Blues for Shindig is a gritty crime novel based in 1950s Soho and written by Mo Foster. Foster has said that parts of the novel are autobiographical, as this London-born author spent her early teens in the streets of edgy Soho. Foster was addicted to heroin and ran in beatnik circles, rubbing elbows with William S. Burroughs and Colin MacInnes.

Inspired by MacInnes' real life depiction of London in his novel,  City of Spades, Foster set out to write a short story that conveyed the same era from the perspective of strong woman. She wrote and rewrote the story of Shindig over twenty years. Foster recently suffered a stroke that prompted her to finish the manuscript for Shindig and send it out to publishers. A Blues for Shindig was published by PaperBooks in 2006.

Plot summary
Shindig is a young woman who survives the rough streets of London's Soho neighborhood by working in an illegal bar and selling drugs in the alleys.
Shindig's daily life is populated by abusers, boozers, losers, crooked cops and gangsters. Yet these seemingly deviant characters look out for one another and Shindig navigates through this underworld with a sense of adventure. Yet, she soon finds herself caught in the middle of a much larger power play.

External links
 Guardian interview with Mo Foster

2006 British novels
Novels set in London
Novels set in the 1950s